Kornél Molnár (born 1933) is a Hungarian boxer. He competed in the men's flyweight event at the 1952 Summer Olympics.

References

1933 births
Living people
Hungarian male boxers
Olympic boxers of Hungary
Boxers at the 1952 Summer Olympics
Place of birth missing (living people)
Flyweight boxers
20th-century Hungarian people